Ryan Bastinac (born 22 June 1991) is a former Australian rules footballer who played for the North Melbourne Football Club and the Brisbane Lions in the Australian Football League (AFL).

Bastinac could play as an inside and outside midfielder and was renowned for his endurance and aerobic capacity.

AFL career
As a child he supported the Richmond Football Club.

Bastinac made his debut in round 1 of the 2010 season against . He gathered 23 disposals however, despite a late surge, North Melbourne would lose the game by 14 points. He collected 24 disposals against  in round 3, his efforts saw him rewarded with the round nomination for the Rising Star, and finished fifth overall in the award. He played the remainder of the season averaging almost 19 disposals, 2.5 tackles and taking 54 marks over the 22 games. He kicked seven goals over the course of the season.

In October 2015, Bastinac was traded to the Brisbane Lions. After four years with the Lions, he was delisted at the conclusion of the 2019 AFL season.

Bastinac played for Aspley in the 2021 VFL Season.

References

External links

1991 births
Living people
North Melbourne Football Club players
Australian rules footballers from Victoria (Australia)
Dandenong Stingrays players
Australian people of Croatian descent
Brisbane Lions players
North Ballarat Football Club players
Aspley Football Club players